ACRS may refer to:

 Accelerated Cost Recovery System, a historical 1981 accounting practice that preceded the 1986 (&forward) "Modified Accelerated Cost Recovery System" (MACRS )
 Air Cushion Restraint System, an airbag
 Area Coverage Rate (Sustained), a measurement of the effectiveness of Mine countermeasures
 Ancient Culture Research Society, a non-profit organisation focusing on archaeological research
 Advisory Committee on Reactor Safeguards, part of the Nuclear Regulatory Commission
 Asian Conference on Remote Sensing, a yearly event spearheaded by the Asian Association of Remote Sensing (AARS), Asia's largest society of remote sensing scientists and professionals
 Astrographic Catalog Reference Stars, a star catalog published by the U. S. Naval Observatory
 Australian Camellia Research Society, a society with a register of Camellia's bred in Australia